NB Global is a large British investment company dedicated to senior secured loans in large US and European companies. Established in April 2011, the company is listed on the London Stock Exchange. The chairman is Rupert Dorey. It is managed by Neuberger Berman.

References

External links 
 Official site

Companies listed on the London Stock Exchange